Phoenix Chinese News and Entertainment or Phoenix CNE Channel  is one of the six channels that Phoenix Television operates. It was launched in August 1999 in order to serve Chinese viewers in Europe. This channel is a 24-hour free-to-air channel based in London and broadcast via the Astra 2G satellite across the continent. The channel broadcasts its Chinese programmes to 91 countries and regions in Europe and Africa, and reach more than 56 million households and 80% of European Chinese penetration.

Phoenix CNE dedicates to promote cultural exchanges and closer economic partnerships between China, Europe and Africa creates waves for Chinese enterprises and provinces in their efforts to open up new trade and investment opportunities in these continents.

Related Channels
Phoenix Chinese Channel
Phoenix InfoNews Channel
Phoenix Movies Channel
Phoenix Hong Kong Channel

See also
List of free-to-air channels at 28°E

External links 
 

Television stations in Hong Kong
Television channels and stations established in 2001
Foreign television channels broadcasting in the United Kingdom